Eucalyptus scoparia, commonly known as the Wallangarra white gum or willow gum, is a small to medium-sized tree that is endemic to a small area of eastern Australia. It has smooth bark, linear to lance-shaped or curved adult leaves, flower buds in groups of seven, white flowers and cup-shaped, hemispherical or bell-shaped fruit. It is restricted to a few rocky mountains near the border between New South Wales and Queensland but is widely cultivated.

Description
The bark is smooth, powdery, white and grey and is shed in narrow strips. Flowering has been recorded in November and the flowers are white.

Taxonomy and naming
Eucalyptus scoparia was first formally described in 1905 by Joseph Maiden in Proceedings of the Linnean Society of New South Wales from a specimen collected by John Boorman. The specific epithet is a Latin word meaning broom-like, but the allusion is obscure.

Distribution and habitat
Wallangarra white gum is restricted to a few mountains near the border between New South Wales and Queensland, where it grows in clefts on large granite outcrops in open forest and woodland.

Conservation status
This eucalypt is classified as "vulnerable" under the Australian Government Environment Protection and Biodiversity Conservation Act 1999 and the New South Wales Government Biodiversity Conservation Act 2016. The main threats to the species are loss of habitat due to land clearing, trampling of young plants and its small population size.

Use in horticulture
The tree is widely planted as an ornamental in southeastern Australia.

References

Trees of Australia
Flora of New South Wales
Flora of Queensland
scoparia
Myrtales of Australia
Plants described in 1905
Taxa named by Joseph Maiden